Tarassothrips is a genus of thrips in the family Phlaeothripidae.

Species
 Tarassothrips akritus
 Tarassothrips grandis

References

Phlaeothripidae
Thrips
Thrips genera